
Capel-le-Ferne  is a village situated near Folkestone, Kent. Its name derives from the phrase "Chapel in the Ferns". It had a population in 2011 of 1,884. It is perched on top of the White Cliffs of Dover.

Its foremost attraction is the Battle of Britain Memorial, opened by the Queen Mother on 9 July 1993 and dedicated to those who fought in the battle. The Memorial is built upon part of a former World War II coastal battery (No. 2 and No. 3 guns). The other part of the Coastal Battery is privately held and under restoration. The Channel Tunnel runs underneath the northernmost part of the village.

The village is twinned with the commune of Oye-Plage in the Pas-de-Calais department in France, about 7 miles (12 km) east of Calais.

Transport 
The B2011 New Dover road runs through the village between Folkestone and Dover. The A20 runs to the north and is used by freight and ferry traffic heading for Dover.

Tourism 
The cliffs offer a spectacular walking opportunity, towards the East Cliff and Warren Country Park in the direction of Folkestone. Towards Dover, Samphire Hoe can be reached and the area is popular for walking or cycling.

Governance
An electoral ward with the same name exists. This ward includes Hougham Without and at the 2011 census had a population of 2,347.

In popular culture

Author Russell Hoban repurposes Capel-le-Fern as "Crippel the Farn" in his 1980, post apocalyptic novel Riddley Walker.

See also
RNAS Capel a first world war airship station to the east of the village
St Mary's Church, Capel-le-Ferne

References

External links

 Official Capel-le-Ferne Parish Council Website
 Official Capel-le-Ferne Website
 Photos of the ancient St Mary's church in Capel-Le-Ferne

Ferne also means "far off', as in, the ferne hills. It was published in Chaucer's epic novel.

Villages in Kent
Populated coastal places in Kent
Civil parishes in Kent